James Randell (4 August 1880 – 7 December 1952) was an Australian cricketer. He played nine first-class matches for New South Wales between 1909/10 and 1924/25.

See also
 List of New South Wales representative cricketers

References

External links
 

1880 births
1952 deaths
Australian cricketers
New South Wales cricketers